Gajo Filomen Bulat (January 4, 1836 – June 9, 1900) was a Croatian lawyer who served as the Mayor of Split and as a member of the Diet of Dalmatia and the Vienna Imperial Council.

Biography
Gajo Bulat was born January 4, 1836, to Francis, a judge in Supetar. He attended high school in Zadar, and received higher education in the University of Graz and the University of Padua. He received his doctorate of law and became a secretary for the Chamber of Commerce in Zadar, and then dedicated himself to being a lawyer between the years 1865 and 1879, he was one of the most distinguished lawyer in Split.

Although he was raised in an Italian culture, but due to Miho Klaić influence he became a supporter of the Croatian national idea, and leader of the People's Party from Split, he was a strong opponent of the Autonomist Party. He won the election against Antonio Bajamonti whose autonomist party used all kinds of means to maintain power.

On 28 June 1882 Bulat was made a mayor in the constituting session of the Split Municipal Council. Between 1885 and 1893, he was the Mayor of Split, and member of Dalmatian Parliament and Vienna Imperial Council.

He fought for the introduction of Croatian in schools and the railway connecting Split with Croatian Slavonia. A historian Dr. Rudolf Horvat writes, "his merit into the municipal government, school and society, and what is built the Croatian Theater ". Bulat started a newspaper "The People" (Narod) and was one of the contributors of the cultural-educational societies "Slavs progress" and "Zvonimir". His People's Party contributed much of the Croatian national awakening of consciousness and defeating the Autonomist. In 1890, Gajo Bulat officially opened monumental fountain known as the Split, Bajamonti fountain.

Gajo Bulat died of a heart attack in Vienna, 9 June 1900 in the middle of parliamentary work, and was buried in Split with great honor, as a great fighter for Croatian ideas and unity of all Croatian area from the Adriatic to the Drava River.

References

1836 births
1900 deaths
People from Supetar
People from the Kingdom of Dalmatia
Croatian People's Party – Liberal Democrats politicians
People's Party (Dalmatia) politicians
Mayors of Split, Croatia